Morin Lake is a small lake north-west of Prince Albert, Saskatchewan, Canada.  Saskatchewan Highway 55 provides access to the regional park which is via a turn off 15 kilometres south of the highway. It is a popular summer destination, with its campgrounds and cabins. Nearby communities include Victoire and Debden.

See also 
List of lakes of Saskatchewan
Tourism in Saskatchewan

References

Lakes of Saskatchewan